Sivapuram may refer to:

 Sivapuram, Kerala, a village in Kannur district, India
 Sivapuram, Tamil Nadu, a village in Thanjavur district, India
 Sivapuram, Thiruvallur, a village in Thiruvallur district, India
 Sivapuram (film) starring Bala